Mutiara SIS Al-Jufrie Airport , formerly Masovu Airport, is an airport near Palu, the capital city of the province of Central Sulawesi on the island of Sulawesi in Indonesia. As the largest airport in Central Sulawesi, Mutiara SIS Al-Jufrie Airport serves as the main port of entry to the city of Palu as well as the surrounding area. The name airport can be separated into two part, "Mutiara" and "SIS Al-Jufrie". "Mutiara" means pearl in Indonesian, while "SIS Al-Jufrie" is an abbreviation of Sayyid Idrus bin Salim Al-Jufri, an Arab-Indonesian religious figure and an Indonesian National Hero from Central Sulawesi. He was a propagator of Islam in Central Sulawesi until his death in Palu in 1969. SIS Aljufri is also a religious figure and founder of the religious organization Alkhairaat that grew and developed rapidly in eastern Indonesia.

History
The name "Mutiara" means "pearl" in the Indonesian language. It was named by the first Indonesian president Sukarno. This name was given by President Sukarno when visiting Palu on October 10, 1957. Sukarno then asked the name of this airfield to Rajawali Pusadan, the Regent of Donggala Regency at that time. At that time, the airfield was named Masovu which in Kaili language means "Dusty Land". The reason was when Sukarno was landing in Palu, which was still within the Donggala Regency, he saw the area glistening like a pearl.

To commemorate Sayyid Idrus bin Salim Al-Jufri, an Indonesian religious figure and National Hero from Central Sulawesi, on 2014, the name SIS Al-Jufri was added to the airport's current name, making the official name of the airport known as Mutiara SIS Al-Jufrie Airport.

On 28 September 2018, Mutiara SIS Al-Jufrie Airport suffered severe damage during the 2018 Sulawesi earthquake and was forced to close after large cracks, one of which was 500 metres long, formed in the runway. In addition, the airport's control tower collapsed, and navigation systems were also extensively damaged. Anthonius Gunawan Agung, an ATC officer who had been directing a Batik Air flight 6231 (the last flight out of the day at the airport) take-off at the time of the earthquake was fatally injured after falling from the ATC tower and died in the following hours. The airport opened with limited services the following day.

Development
A new terminal built with government fund of Rp 139.2 billion was officially operated to coincide with the commemoration of the 50th anniversary of Central Sulawesi on 13 April 2017. The airport terminal is able to accommodate 800 passengers daily with an area of 4,800 meters. The terminal building is made of soundproof material that can reduce the vibration, so that passengers remain comfortable and not disturbed aircraft noise. Some parts of the walls use glass so it is more energy efficient and looks bright all day. Thus, it can save electrical energy so no need to turn on the electric light during the day. The new building is also designed with a variety of proper functions to enable passengers to circulate in it, as well as the implementation of security systems that can separate each user-based function and required level of security. It was also designed how this building would later be developed to accommodate future needs improvement. The terminal is designed with a modular system that uses wide span structures in order to facilitate future development processes to accommodate the increasing flow of air transport. 
In the future, the runway is planned to be extended to 3,000 meters from the current 2,500 meters. This would allow the airport to accommodate wide-body aircraft such as the Boeing 747 and the Airbus A330. This would also help in preparation of making the airport for Hajj embarkation in the near future, as well as the possibility of serving international flights.

Facilities
The airport is located at an altitude of 86 meters (282 ft) above sea level. It has one concrete runway, 15/33 measuring 2,250 x 45 meters. It can hold wide-body aircraft operations. The Central Sulawesi Government upgraded the airport to an international airport, considering Central Sulawesi increasing population and tourism interest in the region.

Airlines and destinations

Passengers

References

External links
 Mutiara SIS Al-Jufrie Airport official website

palu
Airports in Central Sulawesi
Airports established in 1957